William Lewis "Buck" Clarke (October 2, 1933 –  October  11, 1988) was an American jazz percussionist who played with Freddie Hubbard, Herbie Hancock, Les McCann, Russ Freeman, Gerald Albright, Jimmy Smith and others. Clarke's many musical styles include soul, funk and contemporary jazz, with an Afrocentric perspective.

Early life
Clarke was born in Washington, DC on October 2, 1933. At 15, he started working at a display sign store. The father of one of his bosses was a cousin to Duke Ellington, so Clarke began to listen to jazz records by musicians such as Duke Ellington, Oscar Peterson, Allen Jones and Dizzy Gillespie during lunch breaks and weekends, and he became "hooked on jazz." He eventually had a job offer at a D.C. club where he learned to play the congas.

Career
One of his very first gigs was at a show called "Jig Show", which featured dancers and comedians. Clarke would travel throughout the world, going to places such as New Orleans, where he first discovered rumba music. Many others tried to encourage young Clarke to play "real instruments," but his position was the bongo drums.

When he was 16 or 17 years old, he played with Charlie Parker. Clarke expressed his feelings about performing with Wess Anderson's band The Washingtonians which included Eddie Jones and Charlie Parker, saying it had him "shook up" and describing it as "mind blowing". He played with Art Blakey's The Jazz Messengers at the age of 19 or 20. He was a member of an eight-piece band which furthered his musical education. He also played at the Montreux Jazz Festival in 1968.

Clarke was an accomplished freelance painter. Some of his early artwork is displayed here on his Facebook page.

Clarke suffered from diabetes that cost him his leg in 1986. He died on October 11, 1988 in Los Angeles.

Discography

As leader
 1960: Cool Hands (Offbeat)
 1961: Drum Sum (Argo)
 1963: The Buck Clarke Sound (Argo)
 1988: Hot Stuff (Full Circle)

As sideman
With Les McCann
Second Movement (Atlantic, 1971) - with Eddie Harris
Invitation to Openness (Atlantic, 1972)
Talk to the People (Atlantic, 1972)
Live at Montreux (Atlantic, 1972)
Layers (Atlantic, 1972)
Another Beginning (Atlantic, 1974)

With Willis Jackson
Blue Gator (Prestige, 1960)
Cookin' Sherry (Prestige, 1961)
Together Again! (Prestige, 1965) - "This'll Get To Ya'" & "It Might As Well Be Spring"
Together Again, Again (Prestige, 1967)

With Eugene McDaniels
Outlaw (Prestige, 1960)

With Dave Hubbard
Dave Hubbard (Mainstream, 1971)

With Cannonball Adderley
Black Messiah (Capitol, 1971)

With The Isley Brothers
Givin' It Back - "Love The One You're With" (T-Neck, 1971)

With Nina Simone
The Great Show Live in Paris (Disques Festival, 1975)

With Jimmy Smith
Root Down - Jimmy Smith Live! (Verve, 1972)
Paid In Full (Mojo, 1974)
Jimmy Smith '75 (Mojo, 1975)
It's Necessary (Mercury, 1977)

With John Mayall
A Banquet In Blues (ABC, 1976)

With Herbie Hancock
Sextant (Columbia, 1973)

With Freddie Hubbard
Liquid Love (Columbia, 1975)
Gleam (CBS/Sony, 1975)
Splash (Fantasy, 1981)
Born to Be Blue (Pablo, 1982)

With Ron Escheté
Stump Jumper (Bainbridge, 1986)

With Thelonious Monster
Stormy Weather (Relativity, 1989)

See also

 Les McCann
 Freddie Hubbard

Gallery

References

External links

 Buck Clarke discography at Discogs
 Buck Clarke at AllMusic
 
 Buck Clarke (Biography from NightJourneyRewind.com)
 Many Buck's Earliest Recordings  (Discography from JazzDiscography.com)
 Buck Clarke interview in 1988 in his Los Angeles home before his death
 Buck Clarke discography at Jazzdisco.org 

1933 births
1988 deaths
African-American painters
Jazz fusion percussionists
Jazz-funk percussionists
Jazz percussionists
Conga players
People from Washington, D.C.
Deaths from diabetes
African-American jazz musicians
20th-century African-American people